The Care Bears Family is a Canadian animated series produced by Nelvana based on the franchise of the same name, and is the successor series to the series produced by DIC Entertainment. It was originally broadcast from September 13, 1986 to January 23, 1988 on the Global Television Network in Canada. In the United States, the first two seasons were broadcast on ABC and third was aired in syndication.

Synopsis

The Care Bears live in a faraway place up in the clouds called Care-a-Lot, which constitutes a part of the Kingdom of Caring. With the help of the Cousins and their Buddies, they go all around the world on Missions in Caring thwarting the evil plans of Lord No Heart.

Episodes

Voice cast

Season 1
 Jim Henshaw – Tenderheart Bear
 Bob Dermer – Grumpy Bear
 Dan Hennessey – Brave Heart Lion
 Chris Wiggins – No Heart
 John Stocker – Beastly
 Eva Almos – Friend Bear
 Patrice Black – Share Bear
 Melleny Brown – Cheer Bear, Baby Tugs Bear
 Jayne Eastwood – Birthday Bear
 Anni Evans – Champ Bear
 Paulina Gillis – Swift Heart Rabbit
 Luba Goy – Gentle Heart Lamb, Lotsa Heart Elephant
 Janet Laine-Green – Wish Bear
 Nonnie Griffin – Funshine Bear
 Terri Hawkes – Baby Hugs Bear
 Ellen Ray Hennessey – Proud Heart Cat, Bedtime Bear
 Marla Lukofsky – Good Luck Bear, Playful Heart Monkey
 Eric Peterson – Noble Heart Horse
 Pauline Rennie – Cozy Heart Penguin, Grams Bear
 Billie Mae Richards – Bright Heart Raccoon
 Carolyn Scott – True Heart Bear

Additional voices
 Laurie Waller Benson – Polite Panda
 Alyson Court
 Victor Erdos
 Michael Fantini – Adam
 Don Francks – Dr. Fright
 Seth Green - Tony
 Donald McManus – Sour Sam
 Ray Jafelice
 Keram Malicki-Sanchez
 Barbara Redpath
 Eric Richards
 Cree Summer Francks – Gay
 Greg Swanson – Perfect Panda
 Tina Teggart
 Sunny Besen Thrasher – Dale
 Lee-Max Walton
 Jason Whitebread
 Noam Zylberman – Charles

Season 2
 Dan Hennessey – Brave Heart Lion
 John Stocker – Beastly
 Eva Almos – Champ Bear
 Billie Mae Richards – Bright Heart Raccoon
 Luba Goy – Treat Heart Pig
 Tracey Moore – Cheer Bear
 Bob Dermer – Grumpy Bear
 Pauline Rennie – Grams Bear
 Chris Wiggins – No Heart
 Terri Hawkes – Baby Hugs Bear, Shreeky
 Melleny Brown – Baby Tugs Bear

Additional voices 
 Tara Charendoff
 Lisa Jakub – Anne
 Keith Hampshire

Season 3
 Melleny Brown – Cheer Bear, Baby Tugs Bear
 Tara Charendoff
 Bob Dermer – Grumpy Bear
 Luba Goy – Lotsa Heart Elephant, Treat Heart Pig
 Dan Hennessey – Brave Heart Lion, Announcer, Additional Voices
 Jim Henshaw – Tenderheart Bear
 Tracey Moore – Baby Hugs Bear, Shreeky
 Pauline Rennie – Grams Bear
 Billie Mae Richards – Bright Heart Raccoon, Tenderheart Bear
 Susan Roman – Champ Bear
 Adam Simpson
 John Stocker – Beastly
 Sunny Besen Thrasher
 Chris Wiggins – No Heart

Additional voices 
 Eva Almos
 Jayne Eastwood – Bedtime Bear
 Paulina Gillis – Swift Heart Rabbit
 Keith Hampshire – Songfellow Strum
 Terri Hawkes
 Keith Knight
 Noam Zylberman

Home media
Select episodes of the Nelvana series were released on VHS in the 1980s by Lorimar Home Video and Fries Home Video in the United States.

In 2002, the Care Bears toy line was reintroduced by Play Along Toys and featured plush toys that came with a VHS featuring either one or two episodes from the series.

In Region 1, Lionsgate Home Entertainment has released many episodes on DVD in various single-disc collections from 2004 to 2008. In total, 12 collections have been released, each featuring random episodes from the series.

On October 9, 2012, Lionsgate released Care Bears: The Original Series Collection on DVD in Region 1 for the very first time.  The 6-disc set features the majority of episodes from the series (from the previously released discs excluding King of the Moon and Give Thanks) as well as the bonus feature Care Bears Nutcracker Suite.

In Region 4, Magna Entertainment released all 52 episodes (in chronological order) on DVD in Australia in 2004 in 12 separate volumes.

References

External links

 

1986 Canadian television series debuts
1988 Canadian television series endings
1980s Canadian animated television series
1980s Canadian children's television series
Canadian children's animated fantasy television series
Care Bears (television series)
Animated television series about bears
Animated television shows based on films
American Broadcasting Company original programming
Television series about shapeshifting
Television about magic
Television series by Nelvana
Television series set in fictional countries
Television shows based on Hasbro toys
Toon Disney original programming
Global Television Network original programming
English-language television shows